Paramonga is a town in central Peru, capital of the district of Paramonga in the province of Barranca in the Department of Lima.

Etymology
The word paramonga comes from the Mochica language spoken by the people that lived in the north coast, among them the Chimus, who settled in the Fortaleza Valley. Its meaning is the following:

 para (vassals)
 monga (here)
The translation would be "vassals from around here".

If the thesis of Torero were accepted, supporting that the Quechua language arose here, "paramonga" would come from para = rain and munqa = verbal ending of occurrence, i.e., "it's going to rain", according to scholar César Guardia Mayorga.

References

External links
  Municipalidad Distrital de Paramonga

Populated places in the Lima Region